Hendry is a surname:

Hendry is a surname of the Scottish Clan Henderson and a variant of the name Henry.  It is also associated with the Scottish Clan MacNaghten.

Persons with a Hendry surname:

Billy Hendry, Scottish former football player
Charles Hendry, English politician
Colin Hendry, Scottish former professional football player
David Forbes Hendry, British econometrician
Diana Hendry, English poet and author 
Drew Hendry, Scottish National Party politician
Gloria Hendry, U.S. actress
Ian Hendry, English actor
J. F. Hendry, Scottish poet
Jamie Hendry, British theatre producer
Jim Hendry (cyclist) (born 1939), British professional cyclist
Jim Hendry, U.S. baseball General Manager of the Chicago Cubs
Joan Hendry, Canadian former athlete
Joe Hendry (wrestler), Scottish wrestler
Stephen Hendry, Scottish snooker player
Stephen Hendry (footballer), Scottish footballer

Places named Hendry:
Hendry County, Florida, USA

See also
Hendrie
Henry (disambiguation)

Clan Henderson